Yannick Bestaven (born 28 December 1972 in Saint-Nazaire in the Loire-Atlantique region) is a French offshore sailor. He won the Transat 6.50 in 2001, was twice winner of the Transat Jacques-Vabre, and won the Vendee Globe in 2020-21.

Biography
In January 2021, he won the 2020–2021 Vendée Globe for IMOCA 60 class yachts on board Maître CoQ IV, formerly known as Safran II. He won despite crossing the line in third position, thanks to a time bonus received for participating in the rescue of fellow sailor Kevin Escoffier, earlier in the race. An engineer by training, he is the co-designer of the Watt and Sea hydrogenator designed by Eric Tabarly.

Key race results

References

External links
  
  
 

1972 births
Living people
Sportspeople from Saint-Nazaire
French male sailors (sport)
Class 40 class sailors
IMOCA 60 class sailors
French Vendee Globe sailors
2008 Vendee Globe sailors
2020 Vendee Globe sailors
Vendée Globe finishers
Single-handed circumnavigating sailors